The Poole College of Management is the business school of the North Carolina State University in Raleigh, North Carolina, United States. The college currently enrolls more than 3,500 students across its undergraduate and graduate academic programs. In the fall 2017 semester, there were 2,724 undergraduate and 828 graduate students. The college employs around 100 full-time faculty members across its four academic departments: Accounting, Business Management, Economics, and Management, Innovation and Entrepreneurship.

Academic programs 
The college delivers undergraduate and graduate programs, as well as non-degree business training through NC State Executive Education. The college offers undergraduate degrees in accounting, business administration, and economics. The Jenkins Graduate Programs offer a Master of Business Administration (MBA), Master of Accounting (MAC), Master of Management (MM), and Master's and Doctoral Degrees in Economics. The Jenkins MBA program is offered full-time, part-time evening and online.

History 
The College of Management was established in 1992 to provide undergraduate and graduate management education that complemented NC State University's strengths in engineering and technology. Its educational programs focus on preparing individuals for careers in a technology-focused global marketplace.

In 2007, the graduate programs in the College of Management were named the Jenkins Graduate School of Management in honor of Benjamin (Ben) P. Jenkins, III, vice-chairman and president of the General Bank at Wachovia Corporation (retired). At the time, the graduate programs consisted of the Master of Accounting, Master of Business Administration and Graduate Economics Program.

In 2010, Lonnie Poole, founder of Raleigh-based Waste Industries USA Inc. and his wife Carol Johnson Poole, announced a generous gift to North Carolina State University. The gift included an endowment to support NC State's College of Management, which is now named The Lonnie C. Poole Jr. College of Management.

Recent history 
In 2017, Poole College of Management celebrated 25 years of its existence.

Timeline 
 1990 – A committee forms to assess the feasibility of a new college at NC State.
 1992 – The College of Management is established.
 1993 – Richard Lewis becomes the college's first full-time dean, and The Master of Accounting degree is established.
 1999 – Jon Bartley becomes the college's second dean.
 2000 – The college is accredited by the AACSB.
 2002 – The Master of Business Administration degree is created.
 2004 – Ira Weiss becomes the college's third dean.
 2007 – Ben Jenkins III endows the college's graduate programs.
 2010 – Lonnie and Carol Poole endow the Poole College of Management.
 2014 – Steve and Judy Zelnak endow the dean's chair.
 2016 – Annette L. Ranft becomes the college's fourth dean.
 2017 – The Poole College of Management celebrates its 25th anniversary.
 2019 – Frank Buckless becomes the Stephen P. Zelnak Jr. Dean, the college's fifth dean.

Industry engagement 
The Poole College of Management at NC State University actively engages with industry and academia through its centers and initiatives.

Centers and initiatives 
 Supply Chain Resource Cooperative (SCRC) – The SCRC provides thought-leadership to the academic and business communities on the subject of supply chain management.
 Enterprise Risk Management Initiative  (ERM) – The ERM Initiative provides thought-leadership to the academic and business communities on the subject of enterprise risk management.
 Entrepreneurship Collaborative (EC) – The EC focuses on developing students who create new entrepreneurship opportunities. This includes NC State Entrepreneurship Clinic, which integrates research, teaching and real world experience by providing a physical place where faculty, students, entrepreneurs and service providers go to teach, learn and build the next generation of business.
 Business Sustainability Collaborative (BSC) – The BSC focuses on connecting students, faculty, and the business community through sustainability knowledge.
 Consumer Innovation Collaborative (CIC) – The CIC focuses on building and facilitating academic-corporate partnerships to undertake consumer research in applied business contexts.

See also 
 List of Atlantic Coast Conference business schools

References

External links 
 

1992 establishments in North Carolina
Business schools in North Carolina
North Carolina State University
Educational institutions established in 1992